is a Japanese actor, voice actor and singer affiliated with the agency VIMS.

Biography

He was part of the four-unit singing group G.Addict, which was part of the Goulart Knights project, and has acted as one of the main protagonists in the film Kami Voice: The Voice Makes a Miracle. He won the Best Rookie Actor Award in the 3rd Seiyu Awards. He won the Best Voice Actor Award two times consecutively at the 7th Seiyu Awards and 8th Seiyu Awards. He has hosted the web radio show  since April 13, 2014. His variety show Kaji 100!: The 100 Things Yuki Kaji Wants to Do debuted on the Nitteleplus channel in April 2017. Kaji married Ayana Taketatsu on June 23, 2019. On June 30, 2022, he and Taketatsu announced that they were expecting their first child together. On November 3, 2022, the couple announced the birth of their child.

Filmography

Anime series

Anime films

Drama CD

Video games

Live action

Dubbing roles

Live-action

Animation

Publications

Photobooks

Autobiographies

Awards

References

External links
  
 
 

1985 births
Living people
Best Actor Seiyu Award winners
Japanese male pop singers
Japanese male video game actors
Japanese male voice actors
Japanese YouTubers
Male voice actors from Tokyo
Seiyu Award winners
Singers from Tokyo
21st-century Japanese male actors
21st-century Japanese singers
21st-century Japanese male singers
Crunchyroll Anime Awards winners